Kandukuru mandal is one of the 38 mandals in Nellore district of the Indian state of Andhra Pradesh. Its headquarters are located at Kandukuru. The mandal is bounded by mandal.This mandal is located at Kandukur revenue division.

Demographics 

 census, the mandal had a population of 98,769. The total population constitute, 38,090 males and 37,699 females —a sex ratio of 989 females per 1000 males. 8,365 children are in the age group of 0–6 years, of which 4,276 are boys and 4,089 are girls —a ratio of 956 per 1000. The average literacy rate stands at 67.2% with 59,671 literates.

Towns and villages 

 census, the mandal has 20 settlements. It includes 1 town and 19 villages.  is the most populated and is the least populated villages in the mandal.

The settlements in the mandal are listed below:

Note: CT-Census town

See also 
List of mandals in Andhra Pradesh

References

Mandals in Nellore district